Microdynerus is a genus of potter wasps in the family Vespidae.

Distribution
These wasps are present in southeast Asia, North America, Europe, Africa and in the Near East.

Species

Microdynerus abdelkader (Saussure, 1856) 
Microdynerus aegaeicus Gusenleitner, 1998
Microdynerus alastoroides Morawitz, 1885 
Microdynerus anatolicus (Blüthgen, 1938) 
Microdynerus appenninicus Giordani Soika, 1958
Microdynerus arenicolus – Antioch potter wasp  (Bohart, 1955) 
Microdynerus atriceps Morawitz, 1895
Microdynerus bechteli (Bohart, 1955)
Microdynerus bolingeri Parker, 1970
Microdynerus cavatus (Bohart, 1955)
Microdynerus confinis Gusenleitner, 1979
Microdynerus curdistanicus Gusenleitner, 1988
Microdynerus erzincanensis Yilderim & Özbeck, 1995 
Microdynerus eurasius (Blüthgen, 1938) 
Microdynerus exilis Herrich-Schäffer, 1839
Microdynerus gibboceps (Bohart, 1955)
Microdynerus habitus Gusenleitner, 1991
Microdynerus hannibal (Saussure, 1856)
Microdynerus hoetzendorfi (Dusmet, 1917)
Microdynerus hurdi Parker, 1970 
Microdynerus insulanus Gusenleitner, 1998
Microdynerus interruptus Gusenleitner, 1970
Microdynerus inusitatus Parker, 1970
Microdynerus laticlypeus Giordani Soika, 1971
Microdynerus latro Blüthgen, 1955
Microdynerus lissosomus (Bohart, 1940)
Microdynerus longicollis Morawitz, 1895
Microdynerus ludendorffi (Dusmet, 1917)
Microdynerus microdynerus (Dalla Torre, 1889)
Microdynerus mirandus (Giordani Soika, 1947)
Microdynerus monolobus (Bohart, 1951)  
Microdynerus nitidus Gusenleitner, 1991 
Microdynerus nugdunensis (Saussure, 1856) 
Microdynerus parvulus (Herrich-Schäffer, 1838)
Microdynerus patagoniae Parker, 1970
Microdynerus perezi (Berland, 1927)
Microdynerus robustus (Dusmet, 1903) 
Microdynerus rubescens Gusenleitner, 1973
Microdynerus rubiculus Gusenleitner, 2000 
Microdynerus rubronotatus (Kostylev, 1940)
Microdynerus rufus Giordani Soika, 1971
Microdynerus saundersi Blüthgen, 1955
Microdynerus sayi (Cameron, 1908)
Microdynerus singulus (Bohart, 1955)
Microdynerus syriacus Gusenleitner, 2000
Microdynerus tauromenitanus Blüthgen, 1955
Microdynerus timidus (Saussure, 1856)
Microdynerus tridentatus Kostylev, 1934
Microdynerus trinodus (Bohart, 1955)

References

Potter wasps